The FluoProbes series of fluorescent dyes were developed by Interchim to improve performances of standard fluorophores. They are designed for labeling biomolecules, cells, tissues or beads in advanced fluorescent detection techniques.

 FluoProbes dyes are typically used to label proteins or nucleic acids (ultrafast -3 minutes- labeling of antibodies employs Lightning technology). Labeled products can be used for multiparameter detections, life time resolved fluorescence (TRF), polarisation anisotropy fluorescence, FRET, Quenching, FRAP. They are typically used in biotechnology and research applications as fluorescence microscopy, cell biology or molecular biology, as well as infrared imaging. Derivatives with Amine and Carboxyl suit peptide and nucleic acid synthesis, while reactive ones (with succinimidyl, maleimide and hydrazide) suit conjugation by conventional chemistry, while FluoProbes labeled antibodies and cellular probes (i.e. Phalloidin) suit direct use in immunoassays or cell assays.
 FluoProbes dyes that have comparable excitation and emission spectra to standard fluorophores such as fluoresceins, rhodamines, cyanines Cy2/3/5/5.5/7, are claimed to solve limiting issues observed in some applications such as too high background, insufficient polarity, photobleaching, insufficient brightness, or pH-sensitivity. I.e., FluoProbes488 reduces the background in Flow Cytometry and in slide microscopy allowing sharper and brighter images. FluoProbes 488, 547H and 647H are found more photostable  that is taken to good account in applications using long illuminations periods (i.e. scanning such as in confocal microscopy), or for longer shelf-life of reagents (i.e. manufacturing diagnostics).

 The excitation and emission spectra of the FluoProbes series covers much of the visible spectrum up to the infrared region, matching the commonly used light sources and filters.

Similar lines of fluorescent dyes provide an alternative to the FluoProbes Dyes.

References 

Dyes
Fluorescent dyes